Toffey is a surname. Notable people with the surname include:

John J. Toffey (1844-1911), American Civil War veteran
Will Toffey (born 1994), American baseball player

See also
Coffey (surname)
Toffel